Balchikly (Balsıqlı) is a rural locality (a village) in Starokuruchevsky Selsoviet, Bakalinsky District, Bashkortostan, Russia. The population was 192 as of 2010. There are 2 streets.

Geography 
Balchikly is located 26 km southeast of Bakaly (the district's administrative centre) by road. Novokuruchevo is the nearest rural locality.

References 

Rural localities in Bakalinsky District